Vitty is a surname. Notable people with the surname include:

Denny Vitty (born 1949), Northern Ireland politician
David Vitty (born 1974), also known as "Comedy Dave" from BBC Radio 1's The Chris Moyles Show
Jack Vitty (1923–2021), English footballer

See also
Vitt (surname)